Katheryn Meaklim (born 20 July 1989 in Johannesburg) is a South African swimmer who mainly competes in the Women's 200 and 400 m individual medley.

At the 2008 Summer Olympics she competed in the 200 m butterfly, the 400 m individual medley and the 4 x 100 m freestyle relay.

At the 2012 Summer Olympics she finished 16th overall in the heats in the Women's 400 metre individual medley and failed to reach the final, and had the same result in the 200 m individual medley.

Meaklim is the daughter of Zimbabwean athlete Mariette Van Heerden.

References

South African female swimmers
1989 births
Living people
Swimmers from Johannesburg
Olympic swimmers of South Africa
Swimmers at the 2008 Summer Olympics
Swimmers at the 2012 Summer Olympics
Female medley swimmers
African Games silver medalists for South Africa
African Games medalists in swimming
Commonwealth Games competitors for South Africa
Swimmers at the 2006 Commonwealth Games
South African people of Dutch descent
South African people of Zimbabwean descent
African Games bronze medalists for South Africa
Competitors at the 2011 All-Africa Games